Kudi Chin or Kadi Chin, also spelled "Kudee Jeen", etc. is a historic neighbourhood in Bangkok. It is in Wat Kanlaya Sub-district, Thon Buri District, on the west bank of the Chao Phraya River, south of Bangkok Yai Canal. The neighbourhood, dating to the Ayutthaya period, includes communities of several faiths living in close proximity. Today, it is best known for the Catholic community (mainly of Portuguese descendants) around Santa Cruz Church, but the wider neighbourhood also includes the areas around Wat Kanlayanamit, Kudi Khao Mosque, and the Chinese Kuan An Keng Shrine. Conservation and revitalization efforts beginning in 2008 have made the neighbourhood a cultural tourism destination.

History
The neighbourhood, dating to the Ayutthaya period, includes communities of several faiths living in close proximity. It can be divided into a total of six communities, which consists of people of various races including Thai, Mon, Chinese, Portuguese and Muslim. 

For the Portuguese, they received the plot of land from the King Taksin in this area. They emigrated from Ayutthaya after fell in 1767, along with other ethnic groups. Later in 1769, there was a construction of a Catholic church called Santa Cruz Church as it appears today. Their land is considered a land under the administration of Roman Catholic Archdiocese of Bangkok from the past. Therefore, absolutely do not resell or transfer ownership to third parties. There are three types of land and church like this in Bangkok Metropolitan Region, in addition to the Kudi Chin, including Holy Rosary Church in Talat Noi, Immaculate Conception Church in Sam Sen, and Immaculate Heart of Mary Church in Phra Pradaeng, Samut Prakan.

Today, it is best known for the Catholic community (mainly of Portuguese descendants, in 2014, they have a population of about 1,850 people in 293 households) around Santa Cruz Church, but the wider neighbourhood also includes the areas around Wat Kanlayanamit, Kudi Khao Mosque, and the Chinese Kuan An Keng Shrine.  All linked to each other by bicycle lane and promenade along the Chao Phraya River. Conservation and revitalization efforts beginning in 2008 have made the neighbourhood a cultural tourism destination.

The symbol of this community is rooster which is adapted from Rooster of Barcelos, or Galo de Barcelos in Portuguese, which is the national emblem of Portugal to indicate the roots of the community people.

Its name "Kudi Chin" or "Kadi Chin" meaning "Chinese monk's dwelling", refers to Santa Cruz Church, also known as Kudi Chin. However, it has an explanation that should refer to the Chinese temple on the Chao Phraya River that had been built since the Ayuthaya period. Until the time passed to Thonburi and Rattanakosin periods, it has deteriorated. Therefore being rebuilt as the current Kuan An Keng Shrine.

Sights
Beside church and temples, Kudi Chin also has many interesting things:
Baan Kudichin Museum, the three-story renovated wooden house of community leader is a learning center stories about the history of community, the ground floor is café and souvenir shop for visitors. While the second and third floors exhibits objects used in the past, the way of life and faith, Portugal–Thailand relations, Thai loanwords from Portuguese language, and the origin of the Siamese–Portuguese, as well as old photographs of the community. One interesting thing on the third floor of this house is the doll that represents Phi Hua Phrik (Chilli Head Ghost) or Phi Nu Liap (Little Liap Ghost), a lonely naughty imp in form of little boy. It is a common belief of community people since the past, there is a said when the church bell on the belfry rings at 06.00 pm of each day, signalling the home time. The children who are playing in various area of the community need to return home promptly. If anyone violates will be kidnapped by Phi Nu Liap and keeping them as its playmates until it is bored or contented and finally releases them to free without doing any harm. Said that it was  subtle and clever means implemented by the elders in order to set up a curfew for the young children to them safety. Moreover,  on the roof top is also used as a viewing point and taking photos of the surrounding scenery community and panoramic views of Chao Phraya River. The museum open for free admission on Tuesday–Sunday from 09.00 am to 06.00 pm.

Baan Sakunthong, the homey, reservation-only eatery that serves many traditional Thai dishes that are rare and influenced by Portuguese cuisine, it is available by reservation only. Open on weekends, it accommodates three 10-seat tables at a time and bookings must be made at least two days in advance. 

Windsor House, an antique house on the Chao Phraya River behind community, the original owner  was Louis Windsor, a wealthy British merchant who owned Windsor Shop on Charoen Krung Road. Noted for its elegant decay and detailed fretwork, the gingerbread house was built in a style popular in its time.

Baan Phattayakosl, the Phattayakosol family is a well-known clan that have contributed much to Thai traditional music since the early Rattanakosin period. The family researched and produced Thai instruments and composed and taught music. Over many generations, they have amassed a treasure trove of Thai traditional instruments and have it displayed in this museum.

Jantanaphap Thai House, a Thai house, Victoria aged over 120 years built in the reign of King Chulalongkorn (Rama V), made of all teak. This house take from Chanthaburi and brought it to build in Kudi Chin. Interior with Victoria style cabinets. Carved Chinese design on windows and doors. A glass window also shows signs of bullet from the Manhattan Rebellion in 1951.

The highlight of this community is khanom farang kudi chin, a rare traditional Thai snack that has been influenced by Portuguese sweets since the Ayutthaya period. It is dubbed  "Sino-Portuguese snack" or "first Thai cake" and there is a saying that if you has eaten this type of snack as if you had eaten history. Currently, there are only three households that still cook and sell this type of homemade snacks.

Gallery

References

Neighbourhoods of Bangkok
Thon Buri district
History of Bangkok
Portuguese diaspora in Thailand
Populated places on the Chao Phraya River
Historic districts in Thailand